Carlopoli is a  and town in the province of Catanzaro in the Calabria region of southern Italy. It includes the village of Castagna.

References

Cities and towns in Calabria